"The Same Star" is a single by Ruslana, featured on her 2004 studio album Wild Dances. The arrangement and recording were done by EGO WORKS /HIT FACTORY, Miami, United States.

Ruslana devoted The Same Star to her husband, the love of her life.

Ruslana performed "The Same Star", as well as "Heart on Fire", at the 2005 Eurovision Song Contest that was held in Kyiv, Ukraine, thanks to her success at the 2004 Eurovision Song Contest.

Track listing

Music video

Photography director – Oleksiy Stepanov
Choreographer – Iryna Mazur
Ballet of Iryna Mazur “Zhyttya”
Stylist – Anzhela Posokhova
Head Maker – Oleksandr Sytnikov
Producers – Ruslana, Oleksandr Ksenofontov.
Director's name – unknown

Chart performance

   

Ruslana songs
2005 singles
2005 songs
Songs written by Ruslana
Songs written by Steve Balsamo